The Regional Rugby Championship is an annual rugby union competition involving sides from Bosnia-Herzegovina, Croatia, Hungary, Montenegro, Serbia and Slovenia. This was a successor to the Interliga between clubs from Bosnia-Herzegovina, Croatia and Slovenia which started in 2004/2005.  In the past the Championship has also featured teams from Austria and Bulgaria, and invitations to teams from Greece. Currently six teams qualify each season, based on their performance in national championships.  The first season in 2007/2008 had 11 teams. The 2019/2020 season was suspended due to the COVID-19 pandemic.

Teams

Past winners

External links
 Official site

Rugby union leagues in Europe
Rugby union in Bosnia and Herzegovina
Rugby union in Croatia
Rugby union competitions in Hungary
Rugby union in Montenegro
Rugby union in Serbia
Rugby union in Slovenia
Sports leagues established in 2007
2007 establishments in Europe